Horrible Histories: Funfair of Fear is an exhibition staged by The National Museum and Galleries of Wales in 2000.

Critical reception
The South Wales Echo described it as "an Eye-popping exhibition". The article notes that "visitors to the exhibition will be able to throw beanbag Christians into lions' mouths and hear the sounds of the animals roaring. Bloody-axe beanbags can be hurled at Henry VIII's wives, knocking them over to reveal whether they really did lose their heads to the axe-man. A castle, complete with dungeon, is filled with victims being tortured. It looks stunning. It will win over children who have never been interested in history before."

References

Horrible Histories exhibitions